The International School Bangkok (ISB;) is a private PK-12 American-style school in the Pak Kret District of Nonthaburi Province, Thailand in the Bangkok Metropolitan Area. It is accredited by the Western Association of Schools and Colleges (WASC) in the United States.

History

Foundation
ISB first opened as the International Children's Center on the grounds of the U.S. Embassy Bangkok in 1951. It was the first international school to open in Thailand and serviced U.S. Embassy families and other expatriates in Bangkok at the time. Its initial enrollment was 50 children of United Nations and U.S. diplomats. First located on Rajadamri Road, it was known as the International Children's Center (ICC). ISB then expanded to provide both primary and secondary education for English-speaking children in Bangkok. In 1960, ISB moved from the U.S. Embassy-owned grounds to Sukhumvit Soi 15. A few years later, ISB opened a second campus on Viphavadi Rangsit road, but it closed in the mid-1970s with the American drawdown from Vietnam. Finally in 1992, ISB was relocated from Soi 15 to the present US$25-million campus in the Pak Kret District, Nonthaburi Province, within Nichada Thani as "campus town"; on a land that it owns and maintains itself, and that consists of a separate elementary, middle, and high schools interwoven into one Thai-style complex. ISB has students from over 50 countries enrolled.

Parents oversee the operation of ISB, which is a non-profit and non-sectarian school. Parents are members of the school association and elect the governing board of ISB.

Notable alumni
Robert A. Goodbary (1960) - Major General (US Army Ret.) (1948-2016)
William E. Heinecke (1967) - Chairman and CEO of Minor Food Group companies 
Pamela J. H. Slutz (1967) - Retired U.S. Foreign Service Officer; Ambassador to Mongolia (2003-6) and Burundi (2009–12)
Ho Kwon Ping (1969) - Founder, Banyan Tree Hotels & Resorts and #19 on Forbes' Singapore's 40 Richest
Charles Leavitt (1970) - Screenwriter for The Mighty, K-Pax, and Blood Diamond
Michael Young (1970) - TV Personality & Host of "Kids Are People Too" (1978) Executive Producer "Shop Like a Star" (2008)
Susan Schwab (1972) - Current Chief United States Trade Representative, and former president and CEO of the University of Maryland
Richard Powers (1975) Accomplished writer - Finalist, Pulitzer Prize for Fiction, 2006 
Madolyn Smith (1975) Actress - Urban Cowboy, All of Me, Sadat
Timothy F. Geithner (1979) - US Secretary of the Treasury in President Barack Obama's administration, ninth president of the Federal Reserve Bank of New York
Thant Myint-U (1983) - Myanmar presidential adviser, prize-winning historian and author, conservationist, former United Nations official, grandson of U Thant, former Secretary General of the United Nations
Rob McKenna (1984) - Former Attorney General for the State of Washington
Tammy Duckworth (1985) - Senator of Illinois (D)- Elected November 8, 2016. Democratic United States House Representative in Illinois's 8th congressional district - elected November 6, 2012.
Mary-Louise Parker - Nancy Botwin in hit TV series "Weeds". Sarah Ross in the movie "Red" 
Tom Cochran - Obama administration official
Charm Onwarin Osathanond (2005) - Miss Thailand Universe 2006 
Sarunrat "Lydia" Visutthithada (2005) - Famous Thai Pop Star
Maria Ehren (2010) Miss Thailand Universe 2017
Amalie Iuel (2013) Olympic Track & Field Athlete - Member of Norwegian National Team in the 2016 Summer Olympics in Rio, competed in 400m hurdles event, attended the University of Southern California

References 

isb.ac.th

Further reading 
 Fredrickson, Terry, "An American approach to education", Bangkok Post, October 15, 2002

External links 
 

International Baccalaureate schools in Thailand
Buildings and structures in Nonthaburi province
1951 establishments in Thailand
East Asia Regional Council of Overseas Schools
Nonthaburi province
American international schools in Thailand
International schools in Thailand
International schools in Bangkok
Private schools in Thailand
Educational institutions established in 1951
International schools in the Bangkok Metropolitan Region